2020 Champions League may refer to:

Football
2019–20 UEFA Champions League
2020–21 UEFA Champions League
2020 AFC Champions League
2019–20 CAF Champions League
2020–21 CAF Champions League